Limehouse Blues may refer to:

 "Limehouse Blues" (song), a jazz standard
 Limehouse Blues (film), a 1934 film named after the song